The 37th Hong Kong Film Awards presentation ceremony took place at the Hong Kong Cultural Centre on 15 April 2018.

Winners and nominees 
Winners are listed first, highlighted in boldface, and indicated with a double dagger .

References

External links
 Official website of the Hong Kong Film Awards

2017 film awards
2018 in Hong Kong
April 2018 events in China
2018
Hong